Phyllonorycter inusitatella is a moth of the family Gracillariidae. It is known from California, United States.

The larvae feed on Quercus agrifolia and Quercus wislizeni. They mine the leaves of their host plant. The mine has the form of a blotch mine on the underside of the leaf, with two or three widely separated wrinkles at maturity. The mine causes the leaf to bend a little.

References

External links
mothphotographersgroup

inusitatella
Moths of North America
Moths described in 1925